The National Library of Madagascar (Bibliothèque nationale de Madagascar) is the national library of Madagascar. It was established in 1961 and it is located in Antananarivo.

See also 
 National Archives of Madagascar
 List of national libraries

References

Bibliography

External links
 OCLC Worldcat. Bibliothèque nationale (Malagasy Republic)

Madagascar
Libraries established in 1961
Buildings and structures in Antananarivo
1960s establishments in Madagascar
Libraries in Madagascar